Dhanvantari is the physician of the devas in Hinduism. He is regarded to be an avatar of Vishnu. He is mentioned in the Puranas as the god of Ayurveda. 

During his incarnation on earth, he reigned as the King of Kashi, today locally referred to as Varanasi. Dhanvantari is also identified as the great-grandfather of Divodasa, a mythological King of Kashi in the Vishnu Purana.

Iconography 

According to the ancient Sanskrit work Vishnudharamottara, Dhanvantari is a handsome individual and is to usually be depicted with four hands, with one or two of them carrying a bowl of amrita, the elixir of immortality. Dhanvantari is depicted in a stark resemblance to Vishnu, with four hands, holding the shankha, chakra, jalauka (leech), and a pot containing amrita. He is often shown with a leech in his hand rather than the scriptures, indicating the historical practice of bloodletting.

Some texts describe him as holding a conch, amrita, medicinal herbs, and a book of Ayurveda.

Legend

Origin 
The Bala Kanda of the Ramayana and Bhagavata Purana state that Dhanvantari emerged from the Ocean of Milk and appeared with the pot of amrita (elixir of immortality) during the Samudra Mathana, whilst the ocean was being churned by the devas and the asuras, using the Mandara mountain and the serpent Vasuki. The pot of amrita was snatched by the asuras, and after this event, Vishnu's avatar, Mohini, appears and takes the nectar back from the asuras. It is also believed that Dhanvantari promulgated the practice of Ayurveda. Of special mention here is the treatise of Dhanvantari-Nighantu, which completely elucidates Dhanvantari's medicinal plants.

The Brahmanda Purana describes the origin of the physician deity:

Incarnation 
During the second Dvapara Yuga, the King of Kashi, Dirghatapas, propitiated the physician deity for the birth of a son. The deity agreed to incarnate himself as the desired child as a boon. Dhanavantri proved to be a great king, and is described as the "dispeller of all ailments". He is described to have been exempt from infirmities and recognised as a "master of universal knowledge". The sage Bharadvaja educated him regarding the therapeutic practice of Ayurveda, and further caused him to study medicine. The king created a classification of his knowledge of medicine into eight fields and disseminated it to a number of diverse disciples.

Dhanvantari and Manasa 
According to the Brahma Vaivarta Purana, Dhanvantari, accompanied by his disciples, once journeyed to Kailasha. On the way, a naga named Takshaka emitted a venom-spitting hiss. A disciple plucked the diamond upon the head of Takshaka and hurled it towards the earth. Upon learning these events, the powerful serpent-king Vasuki amassed thousands of serpents under the leadership of Drona, Pundarika, and Dhananjaya against the entourage. The poisonous emissions of all these serpents united to make the disciples of Dhanvantari faint. Immediately, Dhanvantari concocted a medicine made from vanaspati, allowing his followers to recover and causing the snakes to faint in turn. When Vasuki understood what had transpired, he sent a Shaiva serpent goddess, Manasa, to face Dhanvantari. Manasa sent the disciples of Dhanvantari into a swoon, but since the deity was proficient in the art of Vishvavidya, he soon restored his disciples to consciousness. When Manasa deemed it impossible to defeat Dhanvantari or his disciples, she held the trishula given to her by Shiva and aimed it at Dhanvantari. Seeing this, Shiva and Brahma appeared before them and restored the peace, sending them all on their way.

Temples

India

In Maharashtra 
In Konkan, There is a Dhanvantari temple at Dapoli, District Ratnagiri, Maharashtra. It belongs to Dongare family and is owned and run by Vaidya Aniruddha Dongare. Many devotees from Konkan and rest of Maharashtra visit the temple and offer their prayers.

Kerala, Tamil Nadu, and Puducherry 
There are a few dedicated temples to Dhanvantari in South India especially in Kerala and Tamil Nadu, where ayurveda is highly practised and patronised. The Thottuva Dhanwanthari temple in Kerala is a particularly famous temple, where Lord Dhanvantari's idol is almost six feet tall and facing east. On the right hand the lord holds amrita and with the left hand the lord holds Atta, Shanku and Chakra. The 'Ekadasi' day celebration, which falls on the same day as the 'Guruvayur Ekadasi' is of special significance.

In Tamil Nadu, in the courtyard of Sri Ranganathaswamy Temple (Srirangam), there is a Dhanvantari shrine where daily worship of the deity is performed. In front of this temple there is an engraved stone believed to be from the 12th century. According to the writings on the stone, Garuda Vahana Bhattar, a great ayurvedic physician, established the statue inside the temple. A prasada or tirtham, a herbal decoction, is given to the visitors. The shrine is the oldest Dhanvantari shrine in the state. Another Dhanvantari shrine is found in the second precinct of Varadaraja Perumal Temple in Kanchipuram.

Dhanvanthari temples in Kerala, Tamil Nadu and Puducherry include:
 Nelluvai Dhanwantari Temple, Wadakkanchery, Thrissur, Kerala
 Sri Danvantri Arogya Peedam, Walajapet, Vellore District, Tamil Nadu
 Thevalakkadu Sree Dhanwanthari Temple, Kulasekharamangalam Post, Vaikom, Kottayam, Kerala
 Aanakkal Dhanwanthari Temple, Thaniyathukunnu, Thrissur
 Sree Dhanwanthari Temple, Ramanathapuram, Coimbatore, Tamil Nadu
 Sree Dhanwanthari Temple, Maruthorvattom, Cherthala, Kerala 
 Sree Dhanwanthari Temple, Prayikara, Mavelikara, Alleppey, Kerala 
 Sree Dhanwanthari Temple Elanthoor, Pathanamthitta, Kerala
 Sree Dhanwanthari Temple Kanakkoor, Alappuzha, Kerala
 Sree Dhanwanthari Temple Poothakulam, Kollam, Kerala
 Shri Dhanwantari Temple, Gopabandhu Ayurveda Mahavidyalaya Campus, Puri, Odisha
 Sri Dhanvantri Swamy Sannidhi within the Sanjeevi Vinayakar Temple, JIPMER campus
Shri Aalkkalmanna Dhanwanthari Temple is situated at Eranthod Village, Angadippuram Panchayat, Perintalmanna Taluk of Malappuram District.
There is also Sri Murrari Dhanvantri Moorthi Kshetram temple in kollam district (boothakulam) paravur. It belongs to a family called Thundvilla, it is owned and run by the family members itself. People offer prayer for there beloved ones and offer paalpayasam to god.
Shri Dhanvantari Temple, Palluruthy, Kochi, Kerala is a small temple managed by Gowda Saraswath Brahmin Community.

Others 
In Varanaseya Sanskrit Vishwavidyalaya, Varanasi, Uttar Pradesh state, one statue of Dhanvantari is present in the university museum. Two statues are at the headquarters of the Central Council for Research in Ayurveda and Siddha at New Delhi. There is another statue inside the Ayurveda Maha Sammelan office, Dhanawantari Bhawan at New Delhi and one statue of Dhanvantari is present at Mohyal Ashram in Haridwar.

Nepal 

There is a shikar style temple dedicated to the god in the Jaya Bageshwari neighbourhood of Kathmandu. The temple is near the famous Pashupatinath temple.

Commemoration 
Devotees pray to Dhanvantari to seek his blessings for sound health for themselves and others on Dhanteras, two days before Deepavali. It is also celebrated as National Ayurveda Day in India, which was first observed in 2016.

See also
 Ashvins
 Ayurveda

References

Further reading

External links 

Dhanvantari in the Bhagavata Purana

Hindu gods
Ayurveda
Avatars of Vishnu
Health gods
Medicine deities